Derick Wanganeen (born 5 February 1991) is an Australian rules footballer who played for the Hawthorn Football Club.

Wanganeen was born in Port Lincoln, South Australia, and is the eldest of four children.

Drafting

Drafted via the 2011 Rookie Draft, Wanganeen was unable to find consistency as a small forward in his early career but a late switch to the backline he found his niche and showed natural ability to read the play and then set up teammates with his disposal. He spent the maximum three years on Hawthorn's rookie list, but had to be delisted at the end of last season and then re-selected via the Rookie Draft at number 33.

He spent 2013 developing in the VFL and was rewarded with a Box Hill premiership. His development as a player was noticed by the Hawthorn coaching staff.

After an impressive pre-season, he was upgraded onto the primary list in place of the injured Brendan Whitecross. He made his AFL debut in Launceston, Tasmania against .

Wanganeen, along with Ben Ross and Jordan Kelly were delisted by Hawthorn on 9 October 2014.

Statisitics

|- style=background:#EAEAEA
| 2011 ||  || 46
| 0 || — || — || — || — || — || — || — || — || — || — || — || — || — || — || 0
|-
| 2012 ||  || 46
| 0 || — || — || — || — || — || — || — || — || — || — || — || — || — || — || 0
|- style=background:#EAEAEA
| 2013 ||  || 46
| 0 || — || — || — || — || — || — || — || — || — || — || — || — || — || — || 0
|-
| 2014 ||  || 36
| 1 || 0 || 0 || 1 || 3 || 4 || 1 || 2 || 0.0 || 0.0 || 1.0 || 3.0 || 4.0 || 1.0 || 2.0 || 0
|- class="sortbottom"
! colspan=3| Career
! 1 !! 0 !! 0 !! 1 !! 3 !! 4 !! 1 !! 2 !! 0.0 !! 0.0 !! 1.0 !! 3.0 !! 4.0 !! 1.0 !! 2.0 !! 0
|}

Honours and achievements
Team
 VFL premiership player: 2013

References

External links

Hawthorn Football Club players
Box Hill Football Club players
1991 births
Living people
Port Adelaide Magpies players
Port Adelaide Football Club players (all competitions)
Indigenous Australian players of Australian rules football
Australian rules footballers from South Australia
People from Port Lincoln